The men's 3 miles team race was a unique event featured only at the 1908 Summer Olympics in London.  In the team race, each competing nation sent five athletes.  For each heat, the top three athletes from each nation had their placings counted as part of the team score, though good performances by the other two could also help the team by worsening the scores of other teams.  Team scores were arrived at by adding the rankings of the top three runners from the team, with low scores being desirable.  Thus, a team that took the first three places in a heat would receive 1+2+3=6 points, the best possible score.

Results

First round

There were two heats in the first round, with three teams competing in each.  The top two teams from each heat advanced to the final.

Heat 1
The four British athletes finished the race hand-in-hand; official reports give them a joint first place in the heat though assigning points to the team as if they had placed first through fourth.  Thus, Great Britain received 1+2+3=6 points.  Neither Italy nor the Netherlands had three men finish the race, and thus they had no score and were unable to advance to the final.

 Individual standings

 Team standings

Heat 2
The United States team finished with 10 points, France had 15, and Sweden had 21.  The top six runners finished in proximity, but the fact that three of the runners were American ensured the top spot to the United States.

 Individual standings

 Team standings

Final

 Individual standings

 Team standings

References
 

Athletics at the 1908 Summer Olympics
1908